Chichonki Malian Hydropower Plant (CMHPP) is a small, low-head, run-of-the-river hydroelectric generation station of  generation capacity (three units of each), located at Sheikhupura, about  north-west of Lahore, Punjab province of Pakistan, on the flows of Upper Chenab Canal. It is a small hydro power generating plant constructed and put in commercial operation in May 1959 with the average annual generating capacity of 22.88 million GWh of inexpensive electricity.

See also 

 Duber Khwar Hydroelectric Plant
 Gomal Zam Dam
 Khan Khwar Hydropower Plant
 List of dams and reservoirs in Pakistan
 List of power stations in Pakistan
 Satpara Dam

References 

Dams completed in 1959
Energy infrastructure completed in 1959
Dams in Pakistan
Run-of-the-river power stations
Hydroelectric power stations in Pakistan
Energy in Punjab, Pakistan